Lamar Taylor (born 21 June 2003) is a Bahamian swimmer. He competed at the 2022 World Aquatics Championships and the 2022 Commonwealth Games where he advanced to final at the 50 m freestyle event.

Major results

Individual

Long course

Relay

Long course

Short course

References

External links
 Henderson State Reddies bio

2003 births
Living people
Bahamian male swimmers
Swimmers at the 2022 Commonwealth Games
Commonwealth Games competitors for the Bahamas
Henderson State Reddies men's swimmers
People from Freeport, Bahamas